Kleistos horos is a circle dance from Thessaly. The dance is performed in a circle with the men leading and the women following in the circle. It is usually exhibited to songs like "San allo de me marane!" The dance has two parts to it, slow and fast, with the handholds being different for each part. Steryios Vlahoyiannis from the Dora Stratou collection sings some great versions of the Kleistos dance.

Greek dances